Kim Han-Won  (born August 6, 1986) is a South Korean football player who since 2009 has played for Suwon FC (formerly Jeonbuk Hyundai Motors and Incheon United).

External links
 

1981 births
Living people
Association football forwards
South Korean footballers
Suwon FC players
Incheon United FC players
Jeonbuk Hyundai Motors players
K League 1 players
K League 2 players
Korea National League players